Karl Becker (2 October 182320 June 1896) was a German statistician.

Biography
In 1842 he received a commission in the army, and was also an instructor in the Oldenburg Military Academy. He fought in the First Schleswig War against Denmark, and rose to be a captain. In 1855, he organized the statistical bureau of Oldenburg, of which he was director until 1872. He edited Statistische Nachrichten über das Grossherzogthum Oldenburg (Statistical reports for the Grand Duchy of Oldenburg; 1857–72). He then became director of the statistical office of the German Empire, where he remained until his death in Berlin. In this capacity, he edited the Monatsheft zur Statistik des Deutschen Reichs (Statistical Monthly for the German Empire) and the Statistischen Jahrbuches (Statistical Yearbook). His writings include Zur Berechnung von Sterbetafeln an die Bevölkerungstatistik zu stellende Anforderungen (1874).

References

1823 births
1896 deaths
German statisticians